Aurora  is a Chilean film written and directed by Rodrigo Sepúlveda. The film was shot in Chile and released in 2014.

Plot 

The film is set in the town of Ventanas in the Valparaíso Region of Chile. Sofia (Amparo Noguera) is a local teacher going through the process of adopting a child when she reads in the news about a dead baby found in the local dump. Sofia becomes obsessed with the fate of the dead girl who she called "Aurora". The baby has no legal right to have a name or be buried, so Sofia initiates a legal process that becomes an intimate journey of personal transformation, with devastating consequences on her life.

The film is based on the life of Bernarda Gallardo.

Cast 

 Amparo Noguera as Sofía
 Luis Gnecco
 Jaime Vadell - Judge Águila
 Francisco Pérez-Bannen - Dr Schultz
 Mariana Loyola
 Patricia Rivadeneira
 María José Siebald
 Daniela Ramírez

Awards 

 Best Film, International Competition Santiago International Film Festival,

Release dates 

 USA, 2014 Miami International Film Festival)
 South Korea, 5 October 2014	(Busan International Film Festival)	
 Chile, 2014 Santiago International Film Festival (Santiago Festival Internacional de Cine) or SANFIC.

See also 

 Cinema of Chile
 Santiago International Film Festival
 Amparo Noguera
 Busan International Film Festival

References

External links 
 

Films shot in Chile
2014 films
2014 drama films
Chilean drama films
American drama films
2010s Spanish-language films
Films set in Chile
Drama films based on actual events
Child abandonment
2010s American films